The Overlook Press is an American publishing house based in New York, New York, which considers itself "a home for distinguished books that had been 'overlooked' by larger houses".

History and operations
It was formed in 1971 by Peter Mayer, who had previously worked at Avon and Penguin Books, where he was chief executive officer from 1978 to 1998.

A general-interest publisher, Overlook has over one thousand titles in print, including fiction, history, biography, drama, and design. Overlook's publishing program consists of nearly 100 new books per year, evenly divided between hardcovers and trade paperbacks. Imprints include Tusk Books, whose format was designed by Milton Glaser. 

In 2002, Overlook acquired Ardis Publishing, a publisher of Russian literature in English.  Overlook also took ownership of the British publishing company Gerald Duckworth and Company Ltd.

In 2007, Overlook's publisher Peter Mayer was the recipient of the New York Center for Independent Publishing's Poor Richard Award for outstanding contributions to independent book publishing.

After Mayer's death in 2018, The Overlook Press was sold to Abrams Books, which is part of French publisher La Martinière Groupe.

Authors
Writers whose works were published by Overlook include:

 Elizabeth Abbott
 Edward Albee
 Katie Arnoldi
 Ken Auletta
 Paul Auster
 R. Scott Bakker
 Walter R. Brooks
 Paul Cartledge
 Robert Coover
 John Crowley
 David Crystal
 Charles Dickens
 R. J. Ellory
 Max Frei
 Milton Glaser
 W. F. Hermans
 Susan Hill
 P. F. Kluge
 Robert Littell
 Raymond Loewy
 David Mamet
 Charles McCarry
 Joseph McElroy
 Walter Moers
 Bárbara Mujica
 Jim Nisbet
 Mervyn Peake
 Charles Portis
 John Cowper Powys
 Peter Quinn
 Joseph Roth
 Tarn Richardson
 Mikhail Saltykov-Shchedrin 
 André Schwarz-Bart
 Gerald Seymour
 Harry Sidebottom
 Alain Silver
 Nigel Slater
 Ludmila Ulitskaya
 Edgardo Vega Yunqué
 Penny Vincenzi
 Les Walker
 P. G. Wodehouse
 Richard Zimler
 Brad Gooch

See also

 List of English-language book publishing companies

References

External links
 

Book publishing companies based in New York (state)
Publishing companies based in New York City
Publishing companies established in 1971
1971 establishments in New York City
American companies established in 1971